Kulilits is a Philippine children's television show on ABS-CBN. It features teaching children moral and values to singing new songs to dances and to mathematics. The show is hosted by Cha-Cha Cañete, Bugoy Cariño and Izzy Canillo. It aired from October 31, 2009 to September 18, 2010, replacing Wonder Mom.

References

See also
List of programs aired by ABS-CBN
ABS-CBN News and Current Affairs

ABS-CBN original programming
Philippine children's television series
2009 Philippine television series debuts
2010 Philippine television series endings
Filipino-language television shows